The MG ZS was a sports family car that was built by MG Rover from 2001 until 2005. The ZS is essentially a tuned version of the Rover 45 (which was launched in 1999). The 45 in turn is a facelifted version of the Rover 400 which was launched in hatchback form in 1995 and saloon form in 1996, which in turn was derived from the Honda Domani.

Development
The model was rapidly created from the Rover 45 after BMW sold off Rover in April 2000. Development of the model was greatly accelerated by the fact that Rover had already created 400 Series prototypes of the car using V6 engines and sporting suspension setups. In fact, MG Rover developed MG versions of all three Rover cars on sale at the time.

The Rover 45 donor car did not have a reputation for being a driver's car, but in fact it was the most suitable car in the Rover range for making into the MG ZS, its Honda heritage providing double wishbone front suspension and fully independent multi link rear suspension.

As a Rover, the 45 was optimised for comfort rather than handling – however, as an MG the opposite was the case. The ZS 180, offering  from the 2.5 L V6 engine and acceleration to 60 mph in 7.3 seconds, received favourable reviews in the press, with particular praise for its steering, handling and suspension. 

Setting the ZS apart from most rivals was the V6 configuration, when most of its rivals were using turbocharged engines.

Variants and updates 

The non-appearance of RD/X60 meant that in the first few months the MGZS was facelifted with the help of the car designer Peter Stevens (together with the rest of the MG Rover range) which introduced a new clear one-piece headlight, new bumpers and a flush tailgate/boot lid with the number plate relocated to the rear bumper together with new wheel designs, colours and a revised interior with climate control using parts from Zonda and Lamborghini, and with all ZS models an optional body kit which was derived from the MG XPower SV was fitted as standard on the ranging topping ZS180. 

The retro design cues adopted when the 400 became the 45 were dropped, for the first time the Rover 45 and MG ZS became noticeably different looking cars.

The MG ZS ceased production in April 2005, on the collapse of MG Rover Group (See John Towers: Rover), and the rights to make the car were soon repossessed by Honda, who owned the rights to the original design from 1995.

The Chinese automaker Nanjing Automobile acquired the Longbridge plant and the MG marque for £53 million ($97 million), Nanjing Automobile formally established NAC MG UK Limited as a holding company for the plant and marque on 12 April 2006.

In 2009 the MG ZS was shown at the Shanghai Auto show badged as an MG5, after MG Rover had ceased, but that never made it to production.

Performance 
Performance data for the MG ZS range:

ZS 180

The MG ZS 180 was the flagship car of the ZS range. It was available as a five-door hatch or a four-door saloon. The 180 included a number of changes over the standard ZS, as well as incorporating all of the features of the ZS+ models, the ZS 180 was equipped with a lightweight all alloy 2.5-litre Rover KV6 Engine, with quad cams and twenty four valves.

The 180 features uprated front and rear brakes, with  front discs (up from ) and  rear discs (up from ) as well as ABS and EBD, lowered sports suspension with uprated springs and dampers, uprated bushes fitted to front upper and rear trailing arms, 17-inch sports alloy wheels with 205/45 R17 tyres.

Externally, the 180 can be identified with deep front bumper, with front bib spoiler and fog lamps and sculptured side sills. A large rear spoiler could be substituted for a standard size as a no cost option.  The 180 was facelifted in 2004, along with the rest of the range, and gained a bodykit inspired by the MG Xpower SV. 

The kit incorporated wheel arch extensions with front wing vents, bumper spats and side skirts. The large 'Extreme' rear spoiler became optional, with a subtle lip boot spoiler fitted as standard. Complementing the new bodykit were the new 17-inch 'eleven spokes' alloy wheels. Both the wheels and bodykit were available as cost options on the rest of the range.

Racing 

The MGZS was raced in the British Touring Car Championship (BTCC) from 2001 to 2008. The West Surrey Racing (WSR) team enjoyed 'works' status for several years and initially ran cars with a two-litre version of the Rover KV6 engine, later switching to four cylinder JUDD engine which was heavy modified K-Series which had a capacity of 2.0 Litres (the largest production K series engine was 1.8 Litres).

Ex WSR V6 cars have appeared in other hands, and a 'junior team' was run in during 2002. 

MG BTCC drivers to date have been:

What the press said
"Drive a ZS180 back to back with a Golf V5, probably the sportiest of the line, and the Rover (based car) stomps all over the Volkswagen, its steering, chassis and engine beating the German into submission over the sort of lumpen road surfaces that make up the British B road"

"Of all the cars transformed by Rover's engineers, this motor is perhaps the most remarkable, as it turned the originally rather dowdy 45 into a fire breathing super saloon"

"When young lads start lusting after what's basically a rebodied and reengineered Rover 45, it's obviously something special. It is no exaggeration to claim that the MG ZS 180 was the biggest surprise of the lot when the new range was launched in summer 2001."

"At first glance it might appear to be a simple case of badge engineering, but the transformation from ageing Rover 45 to exciting MG ZS is a lot more than simply swapping metal monikers. Beneath the wire-meshed MG nose and bespoilered tail lies a lot of skilful engineering by Longbridge’s finest."

References

External links
Head Tec
The first ZS club in the world for the MG ZS.
Rover400-45.info - Online community for owners of post-1995 Rover 400/45s and MG ZS
theMGZS.co.uk - Online Forum dedicated to the MG ZS.

ZS, MG
Sport compact cars
Cars introduced in 2001
Cars discontinued in 2005
Front-wheel-drive vehicles
Sports sedans
Hot hatches

pl:Rover serii 400#MG ZS